Odžovci is a village in the municipality of Centar Župa, North Macedonia. Odžovci was once a former neighbourhood of the village of Balanci and in 1965 elevated to the status of an independent village. The population density of the village is 6.4 km2.

Name 
The toponym Odžovci is a patronymic formation derived from the term odža (meaning teacher, via Turkish from Persian) and the suffix ovci.

Demographics
As of the 2021 census, Odžovci had 94 residents with the following ethnic composition:
Turks 64
Persons for whom data are taken from administrative sources 18
Albanians 10
Macedonians 2

According to the 2002 census, the village had a total of 220 inhabitants. Ethnic groups in the village include:
Turks 203
Albanians 17

References

Villages in Centar Župa Municipality
Turkish communities in North Macedonia
Albanian communities in North Macedonia